Luboš Hušek (born 26 January 1984) is a Czech footballer. His position is defensive midfielder and he currently plays for Slovakia club FK Senica. He was bought from his home club FK Jablonec 97 as replacement for the departed Tomáš Sivok.

References
 
  Club Profile

1984 births
Czech footballers
Czech Republic under-21 international footballers
Czech Republic international footballers
Czech First League players
Living people
FK Jablonec players
AC Sparta Prague players
FC Slovan Liberec players
FK Senica players
Association football midfielders
Sportspeople from Jablonec nad Nisou